Upper Melakwa Lake is a tiny lake located in King County in Washington.  It is the source of the Pratt River.

The lake is located a short distance upstream from Melakwa Lake.  The lake is easily reached by walking upstream from Melakwa Lake; however, a lot of people are too tired to continue after the somewhat difficult trip to Melakwa Lake.  By continuing north from the lake, you will eventually reach Melakwa Pass.

References 

 

Lakes of King County, Washington
Lakes of Washington (state)
Mount Baker-Snoqualmie National Forest
Protected areas of King County, Washington